The Malta Conference was held from January 30 to February 3, 1945 between President Franklin D. Roosevelt of the United States and Prime Minister Winston Churchill of the United Kingdom on the island of Malta. The purpose of the conference was to plan the final campaign against the Germans with the Combined Chiefs of Staff (the United States Joint Chiefs of Staff and the British Chiefs of Staff Committee). Politically, the overriding purpose was to present a united front against Stalin in the Yalta Conference a few days later. That did not happen once Yalta began, much to Churchill's disappointment. Both leaders agreed on the undesirability of the Red Army advancing into central Europe.

The Conference was given the code names of ARGONAUT and CRICKET, as well as several others.

The Malta Conference began on January 30, 1945, but Roosevelt did not arrive until February 2, the last day of the conference.

Participants
Among the participants of the Conference were U.S. Secretary of State Edward Stettinius, U.S. Ambassador to the Soviet Union W. Averell Harriman, Harry L. Hopkins, General of the Army George C. Marshall, Fleet Admiral Ernest J. King, Fleet Admiral Leahy, Prime Minister Churchill, British Foreign Secretary Anthony Eden, Major General Laurence S. Kuter (representing General of the Army H.H. Arnold who was unable to attend due to illness), Field Marshal H. Maitland Wilson, Field Marshal Sir Alan Brooke, Air Chief Marshal Sir Charles F.A. Portal, Admiral of the Fleet Sir A.B. Cunningham, General Sir Hastings L. Ismay and Lieutenant General Jacob Devers.

January 30, 1945

On Tuesday, January 30, 1945 at 10 a.m., the Joint Chiefs of Staff met in Montgomery House, Malta. Present were General of the Army Marshall, Fleet Admiral King, Major General Kuter, Lieutenant General Somervell, Lieutenant General Smith, Rear Admiral Duncan, Rear Admiral McCormick, Major General Bull, Major General Hull, Major General Wood, Major General Anderson, Brigadier General Loutzenheiser, Brigadier General Lindsay, Captain McDill, Colonel Peck, Colonel Dean, Colonel Lincoln.

The minutes show they worked on the agenda for the next American-British Staff Conference, an overall review of cargo shipping and strategy in Northwestern Europe.

See also 
List of World War II conferences
Malta Summit, between George H. W. Bush and Mikhail Gorbachev

References

External links
Foreign relations of the United States. Conferences at Malta and Yalta, 1945 at the University of Wisconsin Digital Collections, Foreign Relations of the United States

World War II conferences
Winston Churchill
Presidency of Franklin D. Roosevelt
20th century in Malta
Diplomatic conferences in Malta
1945 conferences
1945 in Malta
United Kingdom–United States relations
Floriana
January 1945 events in Europe
February 1945 events in Europe
Anthony Eden